Paperimiehen Tytär is the fifth studio album by Finnish singer Hanna Pakarinen, released in Finland by RCA on October 20, 2010. The album marks Pakarinen's first Finnish-language album, with her previous four albums all consisting of songs in English. It was preceded by the title single "Paperimiehen Tytär".

Chart performance

Singles
"Paperimiehen Tytär", the title track and lead single from the album was given to Finland's Radio Nova on August 16, 2010, and released digitally on August 30.

Track listing
"Prinsessa Armaada" 
"Sinut Kokonaan" 
"Se Yksi Ainoa" 
"Hetken Pieni Liekki" 
"Yksinäinen Morsian" 
"Kolme Pientä Sanaa" 
"Miehet" 
"Paperimiehen Tytär" 
"Maailman Ihanin Mies" 
"Miten Pilviin Piirretään" 
"Nyt On Mun Vuoro"

References

Hanna Pakarinen albums
2010 albums